Otake may refer to:

 Ōtake, Hiroshima, a city in Hiroshima Prefecture, Japan
 Ōtake (surname), a Japanese surname
 Otake (Nakanoshima), a volcano on Nakanoshima in Kagoshima Prefecture, Japan
 Otake Dainichi Nyorai, a divine being in Japanese Buddhism
 Ōtake stable, a professional sumo stable
 Dairyū Tadahiro, head coach of Ōtake stable

See also
Ontake (disambiguation)